The Serviceton railway line (also known in Victoria, Australia as the Western line) is part of the Melbourne–Adelaide rail corridor. It serves the west of Victoria, linking the state capital of Melbourne to the cities of Ballarat and Ararat. It once extended to the disputed South Australian border as part of the Melbourne–Adelaide railway. The former broad-gauge track was replaced in 1995 by the  Western standard gauge line.

Services
Metro Trains Melbourne operates suburban passenger train services along the inner section of the line as far as Sunshine on the Sunbury Line, while V/Line services operate as the Interurban Ballarat Line and the Intercity Ararat Line. During peak hour some services originate and terminate at Bacchus Marsh. Passengers on the inner section of the line to Melton are permitted to use Myki tickets to access the services, with this section originally marked as the Melton line on suburban network maps. Beyond Ararat the line is part of the Western standard gauge line and sees The Overland to Adelaide.

Freight services also use the line between Ballarat and Melbourne, coming off the Mildura line. The Western standard gauge also sees a large number of interstate freight trains as part of the Melbourne–Adelaide railway.

On 16 July 2014, V/Line services ceased calling at North Melbourne station due to the Regional Rail Link and separation of tracks between Melbourne metropolitan and Regional trains.

History

The first railway line from Melbourne to Ballarat was via Geelong. Construction of the Geelong-Ballarat line began in 1858 and took nearly four years to complete. The project employed 3,000 men and cost approximately 1.5 million pounds. The line officially opened in 1862, with the first train running on 10 April.

The line was extended from Ballarat to Beaufort in 1874 and to Ararat in 1875. It took until 1889 for a direct line from Melbourne to Ballarat to be opened, in part due to the difficult terrain between Bacchus Marsh and Ballan.

Until 1995 the line through Ballarat was the main route for freight trains between Melbourne and Adelaide, as well as The Overland services to Adelaide, and V/Line services to Horsham and Dimboola. V/Line passenger rail services beyond Ballarat were withdrawn in May 1994. In 1995 the main interstate line was rerouted via North Shore and Maroona; the broad gauge line between Ballarat and Ararat was closed to all traffic. However, the broad-gauge passenger service from Ballarat to Ararat was reinstated in 2004.

Work began in 2005 on upgrades between Sunshine and Ballarat as part of the Regional Fast Rail project: heavier tracks and concrete sleepers were laid, ballast was renewed and a new signalling system was installed. Deviations were built to ease curves on the line, and seven new bridges were constructed – the Lal Lal Creek and Moorabool River bridges were among the longest in Australia. The works were completed and the first VLocity train ran on the line on 22 December 2005. The original line via Bungaree continued to be used by V/Line services as a passing loop in conjunction with the deviation.

In June 2008 Pacific National and grain handler GrainCorp announced they would cease rail freight operations on the Yaapeet to Dimboola line. The decision was based on the Rail Freight Network Review chaired by former Deputy Prime Minister Tim Fischer, which placed the Yaapeet line at the lowest level of investment priority. As a result, farmers at Rainbow, Jeparit and Yaapeet needed to truck their grain to GrainCorp's Warracknabeal grain centre instead of the Rainbow depot. A local council attacked the plan as it would result in the need to upgrade roads in the area.

As part of the Transit Cities program, a new station was opened at Wendouree on 14 June 2009. In January 2017 Caroline Springs station opened.

The railway line was upgraded under the Regional Rail Revival project, beginning in early 2018 with major construction completed in 2021. The project, with a budget of $518 million, saw the duplication of 17 kilometres of track between Deer Park West and Melton, upgrade stations at Rockbank, Bacchus Marsh and Ballan, and added a new station at Cobblebank, also adding passing loops at Ballan and Millbrook. It paves the way for the future electrification of the line to Melton. The new passing loop at Millbrook also allowed the original line via Bungaree to be decommissioned, with level crossings and railway infrastructure at these crossings removed.

Branch lines and extensions

Ballarat region 
A branch line was built from Ballarat to Newtown and Skipton in 1883. This line closed in 1985. A branch was built between Newtown, Cressy and Irrewarra (east of Colac) about 1910. This line was closed in 1953.

A branch line was built from Linton junction to the Ballarat Cattle Yards and Redan in 1886. This line was closed in 1997.

Ararat and western branches

The line was extended from Ballarat to Beaufort in 1874 and Ararat in 1875, Stawell in 1876, Murtoa in 1878, Horsham in 1882, Dimboola in 1882 and linked with the South Australian Railways at Serviceton in 1887.

Until 1993, two daily broad gauge V/Line trains ran from Melbourne to Dimboola as well as the nightly The Overland service from Melbourne to Adelaide. Under the Kennett Government's economic reforms, the V/Line train service was then cut back to Ararat. The Ballarat to Ararat section was closed in 1994 with gauge standardisation of the line, which made reinstatement of a V/Line service beyond Ararat virtually impossible.

The Overland service was re-routed via Maroona after the works were complete, while the broad gauge passenger service from Ballarat to Ararat was not reinstated until 2004.

A branch line was built from Lubeck (between Stawell and Murtoa) to Rupanyup in 1887, extended to Marnoo by 1909, and to Bolangum in the 1927. It closed in 1983.

A branch line was opened from Murtoa to Warracknabeal in 1886 and extended to Beulah in 1893, Roseberry and Hopetoun in 1894 and Patchewollock in 1927. The section from Hopetoun to Patchewollock was closed in the 1980s. The line from Murtoa to Hopetoun was converted to standard gauge in 1995. It has not carried passengers for many years and grain services between Roseberry to Hopetoun were suspended in 2005.

A branch line was completed between Horsham, East Natimuk and Noradjuha in 1887, and progressively extended to Balmoral by 1920, where it connected with a line from Cavendish to Hamilton. The whole line, from Noradjuha to Hamilton, was closed in 1979. A branch was opened from East Natimuk to Goroke in 1894, and extended further west to Carpolac in 1927. It closed in 1986.

A branch was opened from Dimboola to Jeparit in 1894 and extended to Rainbow in 1899 and Yaapeet in 1914. The line was converted to standard gauge in 1995. The line was deemed un-usable after severe flooding in January 2011. An announcement was made in September 2011 by the Victorian Government, that they would contribute $5.3 million to restoring the line from Dimboola to Rainbow.

In 1905, a branch line was opened from Stawell to the Heatherlie quarry in The Grampians, from which large amounts of high-quality freestone were railed, to be used in a number of significant building projects. The branch was closed in 1949.

Another branch line, from Jeparit to Lorquon, was opened in 1912, and was extended to Yanac in 1916. It closed in 1986.

Ararat southwards
A line was built from Ararat to Portland in 1877, via Maroona, Hamilton, and Heywood. A number of branch lines were built from this line, none of which are in use today. This line was converted to standard gauge in 1995.

A line was opened from Gheringhap on the Geelong – Ballarat line to Cressy and Maroona in 1913. This was converted to standard gauge in 1995 and became the Western standard gauge line between Melbourne and Perth.

Line guide

References in popular culture
The Tom Waits song Town with no cheer from the 1982 album Swordfishtrombones refers to Serviceton, The Overland train that ran from Melbourne to Adelaide, and the railway line's disuse.

References

External links
Statistics and detailed schematic map at Vicsig

Railway lines in Victoria (Australia)
Railway lines opened in 1862
5 ft 3 in gauge railways in Australia
1862 establishments in Australia
Transport in Ballarat
Public transport routes in the City of Melbourne (LGA)
Transport in the City of Melton
Transport in the City of Maribyrnong
Transport in the City of Brimbank
Transport in Barwon South West (region)